Fletch Cadillac are an English psychobilly influenced punk rock band from Norwich, England. The band formed in the early months of 2004 initially as a 3 piece consisting of brothers Ben & Joe and long-time friend Dov. The band brought in Ollie 'Jugs' Ward in early summer 2006 to form the 4 piece they are today.

In September 2005 they filmed their first music video for their song Time To Die with funding from BBC Norwich.

Fletch Cadillac's debut EP was released on 27 January 2006 at their headlining show at The Ferryboat Inn, Norwich. The EP is being released with the help of Power Chord, a local independent record label.

Fletch Cadillac's next release will be a split EP with Destructors666, a reformed version of UK punk band Destructors.

Band members
 Joe Halliday - guitar, vocals
 Ben Halliday - drums, vocals
 David 'Dov' Platford - bass, vocals
 Ollie 'Jugs' Ward - guitar

Releases
 Time To Die (single, self-released, 2005)
 Time To Die (music video, September 2005)
 self-titled EP (EP, The Power Chord Label, 27 January 2006)
 split EP with Destructors 666 (split EP, Rowdy Farrago Records, 7 September)

Touring
The band completed its first European tour in November 2006 as touring support for The Creepshow, with shows in Germany, Switzerland, France, UK and Netherlands.

Trivia
 The band name is taken from the film Fletch Lives. The idea for using this as a name came from their Father, who also played the Butler in their "Time To Die Music" video.

References

External links
Fletch Cadillac official website
Fletch Cadillac myspace page
The Power Chord Label

English rock music groups
British psychobilly musical groups
Horror punk groups